Al Taawon Secondary School is an all-boys public school in Bahrain. The school teaches more than 1200 students in grades 10 to 12. It was founded in 2006.

In 2011, the school was exposed to a huge fire which caused damage to some labs.

Facilities 
The school is equipped with twelve computer laboratories, with other labs dedicated to physics, chemistry, biology and mathematics.

References

Schools in Bahrain
2006 establishments in Bahrain
Educational institutions established in 2006